Miroslav Žitnjak (born 15 September 1967) is a Croatian retired goalkeeper.

Club career
After playing with NK Osijek in the Yugoslav First League, he moved to NK Zagreb in 1992 and played in the Prva HNL with them and afterwards again Osijek until the winter break of the 1995–96 season when he moved abroad, signing with Portuguese Primeira Liga side U.D. Leiria which he represented until 2000.

International career
He represented Yugoslav U-21 team until 1990, and afterwards played one match for the Croatian national team in July 1992 against Australia.

References

External links
 

1967 births
Living people
Sportspeople from Đakovo
Sportspeople from Osijek
Association football goalkeepers
Yugoslav footballers
Yugoslavia under-21 international footballers
Croatian footballers
Croatia international footballers
NK Osijek players
NK Zagreb players
U.D. Leiria players
Yugoslav First League players
Croatian Football League players
Primeira Liga players
Liga Portugal 2 players
Croatian expatriate footballers
Expatriate footballers in Portugal
Croatian expatriate sportspeople in Portugal
Croatian football managers
NK Osijek managers